The 2022 Leinster Senior Football Championship was the 2022 iteration of the Leinster Senior Football Championship organised by Leinster GAA.

The draws for the preliminary round and quarter-finals took place on Saturday 27 November 2021, while the draw for the semi-finals took place on Sunday 1 May 2022. 

Dublin won the competition.

Teams
The Leinster championship was contested by 11 of the 12 county teams in Leinster, a province of Ireland. Kilkenny was the only county team not to compete.

Draw
The semi-finalists from the 2021 competition, along with one unseeded team, received a bye to the quarter-finals. The six remaining unseeded teams played in the preliminary round.

Bracket

Preliminary round

Quarter-finals

Semi-finals
The draw took place after the quarter-finals.

Final

See also
 2022 All-Ireland Senior Football Championship
 2022 Connacht Senior Football Championship
 2022 Munster Senior Football Championship
 2022 Ulster Senior Football Championship

References

External links
 Leinster GAA | The Official Website of Leinster GAA

2L
Leinster Senior Football Championship